Joan Murray is an American poet.

Joan Murray may also refer to:

Joan Vincent Murray, Canadian-American poet
Joan Murray (art historian), Canadian art historian
Joan Murray (journalist), American journalist
Joan Clarke, English cryptanalyst and numismatist; known as Joan Murray after marriage.